Royal Aviation was the parent of Canadian scheduled passenger and charter airline, Royal Airlines, which was based in Montreal Dorval Airport. The airline was acquired in 2001 by Canada 3000, which in turn went bankrupt in the months following the events of September 11, 2001.

History 

The airline was founded by Michel Leblanc in 1991.

According to the June 1, 1999 North American edition of the Official Airline Guide (OAG), Royal was operating Airbus A310, Boeing 737-200 and Boeing 757-200 aircraft in scheduled passenger service to a number of destinations in Canada and the U.S., including Charlottetown, PEI, Edmonton, Fort Lauderdale, Halifax, Honolulu, Montreal (Dorval Airport), Orlando, St. Petersburg, FL, Toronto and Vancouver.  The airline also operated transatlantic scheduled passenger flights between Canada and Europe during its existence, including service to Berlin, Frankfurt and Munich in Germany as well as destinations in the U.K.

Royal was acquired by Canada 3000 in 2001 in an all-stock deal. While the takeover/merger was touted in glowing terms in press releases, analysts quietly shared the opinion that, based on the terms of the transaction, Royal had few options and little time left. Michel Leblanc received Canada 3000 shares worth $84 million and became a Canada 3000 vice-chairman.

Almost all of Royal Aviation's Royal Airlines aircraft were re-painted into the Canada 3000 livery, although some maintained a mixed livery with the Canada 3000 logo and Royal Aviation tail design, to recognize the merger between the two airlines. Canada 3000 also purchased Royal Cargo Airlines, renaming it Canada 3000 Cargo. Canada 3000 Cargo was later sold off and became Cargojet Airways.

Only a few months after the merger closed in June 2001, Leblanc was fired from Canada 3000 in a bitter feud, as Canada 3000 filed a lawsuit against him for allegations of fraud and misrepresentation. However, the allegations were never proven in court and Leblanc subsequently sold off all his shares of Canada 3000 before they stopped trading.

In November 2001 the entire Canada 3000 company suddenly ceased operations with no warning for travellers or employees. The company filed for bankruptcy, citing a downturn in air travel during the weeks following the 11 September 2001 terrorist attacks in the United States. All Canada 3000 workers as well as the former Royal Aviation workers lost their jobs.

Leblanc went on to create discount airline Jetsgo in 2002 which went bankrupt in 2005, in a similar unexpected manner to Canada 3000's demise.

Fleet 

Royal Airlines formerly operated the following mainline jet aircraft types:
12 Boeing 727-200
7 Boeing 737-200
6 Boeing 757-200
4 Airbus A310-300
3 Airbus A320-200
2 Lockheed L-1011-385-1-15 TriStar

See also 
 List of defunct airlines of Canada

References

External links

Defunct airlines of Canada
Airlines established in 1991
Airlines disestablished in 2001
1991 establishments in Canada
Canadian companies established in 1991